Wild Dunes is an oceanfront resort on Isle of Palms, South Carolina, United States.

Information
Wild Dunes was developed in 1972.

Wild Dunes has two famous golf courses on it: the Wild Dunes Links Course, and the Harbor Course, both designed by Tom Fazio. It also has a nationally ranked tennis complex with 17 clay courts, and an award-winning family recreation program.

In early 2008, large-scale beach erosion led to the depletion of the beachfront area of Wild Dunes. The beachfront was greatly reduced, waterfront buildings received structural damage, and the 18th hole of the Links Golf Course was washed out. After a lengthy process, at the end of the Summer of 2008 the City of Isle of Palms finished repairing the beach. Approximately  of sand was pumped in from offshore, leading to the restoration of over 150 yards of beachfront. Also, the 18th hole of the Links Course has been repaired, but is now a Par 3 instead of the old Par 5. Wild Dunes worked with the golf course designer Tom Fazio to restore the course's final hole to the Par 5 it used to be, a task that was completed in 2009.

References

External links
 Wild Dunes Resort

Resorts in South Carolina
Tourist attractions in Charleston County, South Carolina
Buildings and structures in Charleston County, South Carolina
Golf clubs and courses in South Carolina